Kavossy Franklin (born July 18, 1975) is an American former professional basketball player who is most known for his time spent in the Australian National Basketball League.

Franklin completed his college career at Augusta State University in 1999. Upon leaving college, he played in the International Basketball Association and the United States Basketball League, as well as in France for Mulhouse.

In 2002, Franklin moved to Australia and joined the Sydney Kings, helping the Kings win a championship in 2002–03. For the 2004–05 season, he returned to Australia and joined the Hunter Pirates. In March 2005, he signed with Skyliners Frankfurt for the rest of the season. He continued on with Frankfurt in 2005–06.

In 2006, Franklin returned to Australia and joined the South Dragons for the 2006–07 season. In 2007–08 and 2008–09, he played for the Wollongong Hawks. During the 2008 off-season, he also had a stint in Puerto Rico with Vaqueros de Bayamón. In 164 NBL games over five seasons, Franklin averaged 19.3 points, 4.3 rebounds and 3.8 assists per game.

In March 2010, Franklin signed with the Harbour Heat for the 2010 New Zealand NBL season. He appeared in 17 of the team's 18 regular season games, averaging 16.4 points, 4.2 rebounds, 2.2 assists and 1.3 steals per game. The Heat qualified for the playoffs and faced the Hawke's Bay Hawks in the quarter-finals. However, Franklin and teammate Corey Webster missed the game after they were stood down for disciplinary reasons. Without the pair, the Heat were defeated 82–77.

References

External links
 Kavossy Franklin at nbl.com.au
 Kavossy Franklin at beko-bbl.de
 Kavossy Franklin at sports-reference.com

1975 births
Living people
African-American basketball players
American expatriate basketball people in Australia
American expatriate basketball people in France
American expatriate basketball people in Germany
American expatriate basketball people in New Zealand
Augusta Jaguars men's basketball players
Basketball players from Houston
Harbour Heat players
Howard Hawks men's basketball players
Hunter Pirates players
New Mexico Lobos men's basketball players
Point guards
South Dragons players
Sydney Kings players
American men's basketball players
21st-century African-American sportspeople
20th-century African-American sportspeople